The Normand Dube Aerocruiser is a Canadian single-engined, two-seat bushplane designed by Normand Dube and supplied as a kit for homebuilding by Aviation Normand Dube of Sainte-Anne-des-Plaines, Quebec.

Design and development
The Aerocruiser 912 is a high-wing braced monoplane with a fixed tailwheel landing gear, the wheels can be quickly changed to skis if required. It has a welded steel tube fuselage and metal aluminium riveted wings and can take a variety of mainly Rotax piston engines.

The design has been developed into Aerocruiser Plus, a four-seat version with a gross weight of  powered by a  Lycoming O-360 engine and the Aerocruiser 450 Turbo, a six-seat version with a gross weight of  powered by a  Lycoming TIGO-541 engine.

Operational history
By March 2017, 56 examples had been registered with Transport Canada and one in the United States with the Federal Aviation Administration.

Specifications (Aerocruiser 912S)

References

Notes

Bibliography

External links

1980s Canadian ultralight aircraft
Homebuilt aircraft
Aerocruiser